The 34th Aeromedical Evacuation Squadron (34 AES) is a unit of the United States Air Force. It is part of the 302d Airlift Wing at Peterson AFB, Colorado. It is a component of Air Force Reserve Command of the United States Air Force, and is part of the air force component of United States Transportation Command.

34 AES provides tactical aeromedical evacuation for U.S. troops and regional Unified Commands using C-130 Hercules and other aircraft. The unit is manned by flight nurses, Medical Service Corps officers, aeromedical evacuation technicians, medical administration and logistics technicians, and radio and communications operators.

The 34th AES was activated in 1959 at Brooks AFB, Texas as part of the 433d Troop Carrier Wing which operated the C-119 “Flying Boxcar”.  The following year due to the closure of the Brooks airfield the 433d and its associated units moved a short distance west to Kelly AFB, in 1966 the flying mission converted to the C-124 “Globemaster” transport.  From 1968-69 the 34th was activated to federal service and assigned to Yokota Air Base, Japan where its members augmented aeromedical evacuation missions flown on the C-141 “Starlifter” flying wounded out of South Vietnam and on to the continental U.S.In 1971 the mission changed to tactical air evac when the parent unit converted to the C-130 “Hercules”, in 1976 the squadron became part of the newly activated 32d Aeromedical Evacuation Group.  The 34th provide air evac support for U.S. military forces during Operation Just Cause in 1989 and was activated again in 1991 for Operation Desert Storm.  As a result of new Air Force regulations in 1994 the unit was redesignated the 433d AES, in 2008 the 34th was brought back under the 302d Airlift Wing at Peterson AFB, Colorado.
     
      

Aeromedical evacuation squadrons of the United States Air Force